Chakhir Belghazouani (born 6 October 1986 in Porto-Vecchio) is a former professional footballer who played as a midfielder. Born in France, he represented the Morocco U17 national team and the France U20 and France U21 national teams at youth international level before making eight appearances for the Morocco senior national team.

Club career
Belghazouani began his career with Grenoble Foot 38 and in 2005 was promoted to the first team. After two years in Ligue 2 with Grenoble, he joined top Ukrainian club Dynamo Kyiv for €800,000, where he played in three games, scoring a goal on his debut. He left on loan for RC Strasbourg on 20 June 2008 returning to Ukraine on 1 November. On 16 February 2009, Belghazouani moved to Neuchâtel Xamax on loan from Dynamo Kyiv until 30 June 2009 and then on 16 July 2009 he was loaned to Tours FC.

On 15 July 2012, Belghazouani moved from Belgian S.V. Zulte Waregem to Ligue 1 team AC Ajaccio on a three-year contract. He was loaned to R. White Star Bruxelles in January 2014.

On 10 June 2014, Ligue 2 side Brest announced the signature of Belghazouani with a two-year contract. On 11 September 2015, Belghazouani signed for Greek Super League club Levadiakos for an undisclosed fee.

Belghazouani joined Blue Boys Muhlenbach in the Luxembourg Division of Honour on 23 January 2019 on a contract until June 2020.

International career
Belghazouani played for the Morocco Under 17s, then at the U-20 and U-21 level for France including in the 2006 Toulon Tournament.

Managerial and later career
At the end of September 2019, 32-year old Belghazouani decided to retire. After bringing two players to FC Blue Boys Muhlenbach during the winter transfer market 2019-20, respectively Arnaud Guedj and Mamadou Samassa, Muhlenbach hired him as sporting director in February 2020.

References

External links
 Football.ch Profile
 LFP Profile
 French League Profile
 foot-national.com Profile

1986 births
Living people
People from Porto-Vecchio
Sportspeople from Corse-du-Sud
French sportspeople of Moroccan descent
French footballers
Moroccan footballers
Footballers from Corsica
Association football defenders
Morocco international footballers
France youth international footballers
France under-21 international footballers
SC Toulon players
Grenoble Foot 38 players
FC Dynamo Kyiv players
RC Strasbourg Alsace players
Neuchâtel Xamax FCS players
Tours FC players
S.V. Zulte Waregem players
AC Ajaccio players
RWS Bruxelles players
Stade Brestois 29 players
Levadiakos F.C. players
FC Blue Boys Muhlenbach players
Ligue 2 players
Swiss Super League players
Belgian Pro League players
Ligue 1 players
Challenger Pro League players
Super League Greece players
Luxembourg Division of Honour players
Luxembourg National Division players
2013 Africa Cup of Nations players
Moroccan expatriate footballers
French expatriate footballers
Moroccan expatriate sportspeople in Ukraine
Moroccan expatriate sportspeople in Switzerland
Moroccan expatriate sportspeople in Belgium
Moroccan expatriate sportspeople in Greece
Moroccan expatriate sportspeople in Luxembourg
Expatriate footballers in Ukraine
Expatriate footballers in Switzerland
Expatriate footballers in Belgium
Expatriate footballers in Greece
Expatriate footballers in Luxembourg